Cephalotrichum is a genus of fungi belonging to the family Microascaceae.

Species
 

Species:

Cephalotrichum acutisporum
Cephalotrichum album
Cephalotrichum antarcticum

References

Microascales
Sordariomycetes genera